An agreement signed between the Allied Powers of the First World War on September 10, 1919. The agreement was registered in the League of Nations Treaty Series on 21 October 1920.

The agreement was concerned with states which either were established or gained new territories following the dissolution of the Austro-Hungarian Empire - Romania, Poland, Yugoslavia and Czechoslovakia.

Article 1 of the agreement stipulated for the payment by the above governments of 1.5 billion Gold Francs as the cost for gaining these new territories. Article 2 laid the rules for distribution of the payments between the said above governments. Articles 3-5 stipulated the sums will be deducted from the war reparations these governments were to receive from the Austrian government.

See also 
 Treaty of Saint-Germain-en-Laye (1919) 
 Agreement Between the Allied and Associated Powers with Regard to the Italian Reparation Payments

Notes

External links 
 text of the agreement

Interwar-period treaties
Treaties concluded in 1919
Treaties entered into force in 1920
Treaties of the United Kingdom (1801–1922)
Treaties of the French Third Republic
Paris Peace Conference (1919–1920)
Treaties of the Kingdom of Italy (1861–1946)
Treaties of the United States
Treaties of Belgium
Treaties of the Republic of China (1912–1949)
Treaties of Cuba
Treaties of the Kingdom of Greece
Treaties of the Empire of Japan
Treaties of Nicaragua
Treaties of Panama
Treaties of the Second Polish Republic
Treaties of the Portuguese First Republic
Treaties of the Kingdom of Romania
Treaties of the Kingdom of Yugoslavia
Treaties of Czechoslovakia
Treaties of Thailand